The 1966 Oregon Webfoots football team represented the University of Oregon in the Athletic Association of Western Universities (AAWU) during the 1966 NCAA University Division football season. Three home games were played on campus in Eugene at Hayward Field and one at Multnomah Stadium in Portland.

Under sixteenth-year head coach Len Casanova, the Ducks were 3–7 overall and 1–3 in the AAWU (later Pacific-8 Conference, or Pac-8). Only one of its four teams from the state of California was on the schedule, Stanford in Portland, the sole conference victory.

Oregon tied for sixth in the AAWU and were outscored 129 to 118. The team's statistical leaders included Mike Barnes with 710 passing yards, Steve Jones with 542 rushing yards, and Scott Cress with 402 receiving yards.

This was the final season for Casanova as head coach and for varsity football at Hayward Field; Autzen Stadium debuted in 1967 with new head coach Jerry Frei, who was previously the offensive line coach. Casanova became the athletic director and retired in 1970.

Schedule

References

External links
 WSU Libraries: Game video – Washington State at Oregon – November 5, 1966

Oregon
Oregon Ducks football seasons
Oregon Webfoots football